is a private Japanese university located in the city of Nagasaki, Nagasaki Prefecture, Japan. Its nickname is Sōkadai and its public abbreviation is Chōsōdai.

External links 

 Official website 
Information from Nagasaki-Wiki gives some background on the university 

Buildings and structures in Nagasaki
Universities and colleges in Nagasaki Prefecture